Donnacha Dennehy (born 17 August 1970) is an Irish composer and leader of the Crash Ensemble specializing in contemporary classical music. According to musicologist Bob Gilmore, Dennehy's "high profile of his compositions internationally, together with his work as artistic director of Dublin’s Crash Ensemble, has distinguished him as one of the best-known voices of his generation of Irish composers".

Career and works
Dennehy was born in Dublin, where he read music at Trinity College where he studied composition with Hormoz Farhat. He continued his studies in music at the University of Illinois at Urbana-Champaign (UIUC), with support from a Fulbright Scholarship, and earned his master's and doctoral degrees at UIUC. His post-doctoral musical period included a stint at IRCAM, with Gérard Grisey, and studies in the Netherlands with Louis Andriessen.

In 1997, Dennehy returned to Dublin and subsequently co-founded the Crash Ensemble, which focuses on the performance and recording of contemporary music. His works for the Crash Ensemble include Junk Box Fraud, Derailed, and For Herbert Brun. He later returned to Trinity College Dublin as a lecturer in music. His 2005 work for chorus and orchestra, Hive, displays his developing interest in microtones and harmonies based on harmonic spectra. His composition Grá Agus Bás, which was premiered in February 2007, incorporated music from the sean nós tradition and was a collaboration with the Irish vocalist Iarla Ó Lionáird. He is a member of Aosdána, Ireland's state-sponsored academy of artists.

NMC Records in London released the first portrait CD devoted to his music, Elastic Harmonic (NMC D133), in June 2007. In the spring of 2011, Nonesuch released an album with Grá Agus Bás and the Yeats cycle That the Night Come. His first opera, The Last Hotel, an 80-minute chamber work with a libretto by Enda Walsh about a woman planning her suicide, received its premiere on 8 August 2015 in Edinburgh, followed by performances in Dublin, London, New York and Luxembourg. A recording (taken live from the Luxembourg performances) was issued in 2019. The Hunger, about the Great Irish Famine, premiered in June 2016 at a concert performance in Washington DC, and in a staged production in St. Louis and at the Brooklyn Academy of Music, all with the orchestra Alarm Will Sound.

Dennehy was a visiting scholar at Princeton University from 2012 onwards. He served as composer-in-residence for the Fort Worth Symphony Orchestra in 2013/14. In the fall of 2014, he joined the faculty of the music department at Princeton University.

Compositions

Orchestra / chamber orchestra
 Junk Box Fraud (1997)
 The Vandal (2000)
 O (2002)
 Elastic Harmonic (2005); violin and orchestra
 Hive (2005); voices and orchestra
 Aisling Gheal (2007); voice and chamber orchestra
 Grá agus Bás (2007); voice and chamber orchestra
 Crane (2009)
 That the Night Come (2010); soprano and chamber orchestra
 If he died, what then (2012); soprano and chamber orchestra
 Disposable Dissonance (2012)
 The Hunger [(parts I–IV) 2013]; soprano and chamber orchestra
 Three Sean Nós Settings (2013); voice and orchestra
 Dirty Light (2013)
 Turn (2014)
 Memoria (2021); symphony orchestra

Small ensemble with voice
 Two Yeats Songs (1993); soprano and flute
 Hinterlands (2002); two female voices and backing track
 To Herbert Brun (2002); voice, saxophone, trombone, double bass, and live electronics
 The Weathering (2004); soprano, recorder, percussion, violin, and video
 Swift's Epitaph (2008); countertenor and percussion

Instrumental ensemble
 Pluck, Stroke, and Hammer (1997); piano quintet
 The Traces of a Revolutionary Song (1998)
 A Game for Gentlemen Played by Thugs (1999)
 Severance (1999)
 Ecstasis, full stop (1999); string quartet and backing track
 Counting (2000); string quartet and backing track
 Derailed (2000)
 Composition for percussion, loops, blips and flesh (2002); percussion sextet
 Glamour Sleeper (2002)
 Streetwalker (2003)
 The Pale (2003); saxophone quartet and percussion sextet
 The Blotting (2004)
 Table Manners (2004); percussion quartet
 Mild, Medium-Lasting, Artificial Happiness (2004); saxophone quartet or any quartet of like-sounding instruments
 Tilt (2006); electric guitar quartet
 Bulb (2006); piano trio
 Pushpulling (2007); string quartet
 Fold (2008)
 STAMP (2008); string quartet
 As An Nós (2009)
 An Irish Process (2009)
 Céad Slán (One Hundred Goodbyes) (2011); string quartet and backing track

Solo/electroacoustic
 Work for Organ (1992)
 GUBU (1995); tape
 Begobs I–IV (1995); piano
 Metropolis Mutabilis (1995); tape and optional video (by Hugh Reynolds)
 Voitures (1996); oboe and tape
 Curves (1997); amplified harp and tape
 Swerve (1998); flute and tape
 FAT (2000); flute and tape
 Mad, Avid, Sad (2000); organ
 pAt (2001); piano and tape
 [H]interlands (2002); two female voices and tape
 PADDY (2003); percussion
 BRAT (2000/5); recorder and tape (arrangement of FAT)
 North Strand (2007); piano
 North Circular (2007); piano
 Reservoir (2007); piano
 Stainless Staining (2007); piano and backing track
 Overstrung (2010); violin and backing track
 Misterman (2011); music for a play by Enda Walsh

Open ensemble
 Blips and Static (2002); multiple boomboxes
 Flashbulb (2006); three melody instruments and one struck instrument
 A Fatal Optimist (2008); for any instrumentation

Opera
 The Last Hotel (2015)
 The Hunger (2016)
 The Second Violinist (2017)
 The First Child (2021)

Discography 
 Elastic Harmonic. NMC, 2007 (includes Glamour Sleeper; Paddy; Junk Box Fraud; Elastic Harmonic, pAt, Streetwalker)
 Grá agus Bás. Nonesuch, 2011
 Stainless Staining. Canteloupe, 2012 (Lisa Moore, piano Stainless Staining; Reservoir)

Notes

External links 

 
 New York Times review
 Details of Lisa Moore EP recording
 Princeton University page on Donnacha Dennehy
 WQXR 96.3 FM, New York City, Meet the Composer: 'Donnacha Dennehy: I. "Mine is not the standard childhood"'. 26 August 2014
 WQXR 96.3 FM, New York City, Meet the Composer: "Donnacha Dennehy: II. Grisey, Andrissen and Gender Confusion". 26 August 2014
 WQXR 96.3 FM, New York City, Meet the Composer: "Donnacha Dennehy: Composing With Frequency ". 26 August 2014
 NMC Records page on Donnacha Dennehy

1970 births
20th-century classical composers
21st-century classical composers
Academics of Trinity College Dublin
Alumni of Trinity College Dublin
Aosdána members
Electroacoustic music composers
Irish classical composers
Living people
Irish male classical composers
Modernist composers
Musicians from Dublin (city)
University of Illinois at Urbana–Champaign School of Music alumni
Experimental Music Studios alumni
20th-century male musicians
21st-century male musicians